Events from the year 1737 in Scotland.

Incumbents 

 Secretary of State for Scotland: vacant

Law officers 
 Lord Advocate – Duncan Forbes, then Charles Erskine
 Solicitor General for Scotland – Charles Erskine, then William Grant of Prestongrange

Judiciary 
 Lord President of the Court of Session – Lord North Berwick until 20 June; then Lord Culloden
 Lord Justice General – Lord Ilay
 Lord Justice Clerk – Lord Milton

Events 
 The Lord Provost of Edinburgh is debarred from office following the previous year's Porteous Riots.
 Aberdeen Royal Infirmary founded as Woolmanhill Hospital.
 Royal Society of Edinburgh formed as the Edinburgh Society for Improving Arts and Sciences and particularly Natural Knowledge.
 Kilmichael Bridge in Argyll built.
 Construction of a new Glasgow town hall begins.
 Andrew Rodger, a farmer on the estate of Cavers, south Roxburghshire, develops a winnowing machine for corn, called a 'fanner'.

Births 
 25 March (bapt.) – William Forsyth, horticulturist (died 1804 in London)
 17 July – John Bowes, 9th Earl of Strathmore and Kinghorne, born John Lyon (died 1776 at sea)
 29 August – John Hunter, Royal Navy officer and governor of New South Wales (died 1821 in London)
 14 September – Alexander Geddes, Catholic theologian and scholar (died 1802 in London)
 James Clark, physician and plantation owner in Dominica (died 1819 in London)
 John Donaldson, miniature painter (died 1801 in London)

Deaths 
 29 January – George Hamilton, 1st Earl of Orkney, soldier (born 1666; died in London)
 1 February – Hew Dalrymple, Lord North Berwick, judge and politician (born 1652)

The arts
 Allan Ramsay co-writes and edits the last volume of The Tea-Table Miscellany, a collection of Scots songs.

See also 

 Timeline of Scottish history

References 

 
Years of the 18th century in Scotland
Scotland
1730s in Scotland